Ibrahim Zaid [إبراهيم زايد in Arabic] (born 22 January 1990) is a Saudi international football player. He is a goalkeeper for Al-Hazem.

Honours
Al-Shabab
 King Cup: 2014

Al-Hazem
MS League: 2020–21

External links 
 

1990 births
Living people
Saudi Arabian footballers
Al-Shabab FC (Riyadh) players
Al Hilal SFC players
Al-Faisaly FC players
Al-Washm Club players
Al-Tai FC players
Al-Hazem F.C. players
Saudi Professional League players
Saudi First Division League players
Association football goalkeepers